Palaemon may refer to:

In Greek mythology
Palaemon, epithet of Heracles
Palaemon, son of Heracles by either Autonoe or Iphinoe 
Palaemon, the name that Melicertes received upon deification
Palaemon, one of the Argonauts, son of Aetolus (not to be confused with Palaemonius, son of Hephaestus and also an Argonaut)
Palaemon, a son of Priam

Historical figures
Remmius Palaemon, the ancient Roman grammarian
Teacher of Saint Pachomius

In science
Palaemon (crustacean), a genus of shrimps